Chester Hospital can refer to:

Chester County Hospital, part of UPHS
Chester-le-Street Hospital
Countess of Chester Hospital
Crozer-Chester Medical Center
West Chester Hospital